Jamie Salter may refer to:

Jamie Salter (businessman), American business executive
Jamie Salter (swimmer), British swimmer
Jamie Salter (Black Mirror), a character in the TV series

See also
James Salter (disambiguation)